Doctors Charter School of Miami Shores is a public charter school located on  at Barry University Campus in Miami Shores, in the U.S. state of Florida.

Overview
Doctors Charter School of Miami Shores is a community-based, "A" rated college preparatory school. It is located within the Miami-Dade County Public School District and holds a municipal charter through the Village of Miami Shores.

History
Doctors Charter School of Miami Shores originally opened in 1997 as a middle school called Miami Shores/Barry University Charter School.  The school included nine portable structures built on the corner of NW 115th Street and NW 2nd Avenue, and served as an alternative to Horace Mann Middle School for Miami Shores residents.

Upon gaining further funding in 2005, the school was renamed Doctors Charter School of Miami Shores. A permanent structure was built on land that once was the home of the Biscayne Kennel Club, and later owned by Barry University. It was built with funds from the North Dade Medical Foundation and the financial support of the citizens of Miami Shores.

See also
Miami-Dade County Public Schools
High school
Education in the United States

References

External links
Doctors Charter School official website
Miami-Dade County Public Schools site

Public middle schools in Florida
Miami-Dade County Public Schools
Educational institutions established in 2005
High schools in Miami-Dade County, Florida
Charter schools in Florida
Public high schools in Florida
2005 establishments in Florida